The Ecnomidae are a family of caddisflies comprising 9 genera with a total of 375 species.

Distribution
The Ecinomidae have a Gondwanan distribution, except one genus, which also is present in Oriental and Palearctic regions.

Morphology
Ocelli are absent. The maxillary palp is five-segmented. The apical segment is flexible. The antennae are, at most, as long as the forewing. Forewing R1 is usually forked at the apex; the discoidal and median cells present and closed. The female abdomen terminates either flat out or with an elongated ovipositor.

The head and all thoracic nota are sclerotised. The prolegs on the abdomen are highly formed with large anal claws terminal.

Behavior and ecology
The Ecnomidae larval stage, like most trichoptera larvae, is spent completely in fresh water. They are predatory, but some genera feed also on algae and detritus. They construct fixed tubes, retreats of silk, on logs or rocks. Permanent ponds and lakes or slower-flowing waters is suitable habitat for Ecnomidae larvae.

Taxonomy and systematics
The Ecnomidae taxonomy has been problematic, Ecnomidae was first described (Ulmer 1903) as a subfamily of Hydropsychidae, and later as a subfamily within Psychomiidae. The family Ecnomidae is now accepted as  monophyletic beside its sister-group Polycentropodidae. The Ecnomidae contain at least 9 genera with the most diversity found in the genus Ecnomus. Currently, a total of 375 species are described. In recent years, several new species has been discovered, mainly from the Oceania region. Other phylogenetically distinct genera exist which have not been scientifically described yet.

Genera 
Agmina: 20 species endemic to New Caledonia
Ecnomina: this Australian genus consists of one species phylogenetically distinct from Ecnomina
Ecnomina: 36 named species found in Australia, New Caledonia and New Zealand
Zelandoptila: two species endemic to Australia and New Zealand
Austrotinodes: 37 named species distributed in South and Central America, forms a sister group to 11 Austrotinodes species found in Australia
Daternomina: 10–20 species found in Australia, especially Tasmania, was formerly described as Ecnomina, but is now regarded as genus since they possess modified wing venation and female genitalia characters
Ecnomus: more than 260 described species widespread in the Palearctic, Oriental and Afrotropical regions. Psychomyiellodes, is a monophyletic group within Ecnomus, with eight species endemic to the Afrotropical region.
Parecnomina: seven described species endemic to the Afrotropical region, is easily distinguished from Ecnomus based on wing and genitalia characters, and is regarded as a sister group to Ecnomus.
†Archaeotinodes Baltic amber, Eocene

All Ecnomidae genera are restricted to the Southern Hemisphere except the genus Ecnomus, which is widely distributed. This means the group of may have a Gondwanan origin. The genus Ecnomus is also known from the Barremian aged Lebanese amber.

References 

 Cartwright, D.I. (2009) Austrodinodes Schmid, a South and Central American caddisfly genus, newly recorded in Australia, with the description of new species. Zootaxa 2142, 1-19. 
 Cartwright, D.I. (2008) A review of the Australian species of Ecnomina Kimmins and Daternomina Neboiss (Trichoptera) Zootaxa 1774, Magnolia Press 
 Dean, J.C. (2004) Identification keys to Australian families and genera of caddis-fly larvae (Trichoptera). Identification guide no. 50. Cooperative Research for Freshwater Ecology, Albury. 
 Holzenthal, R.W. Blahnik, R.S. Prather, A.L. Kjer, K.M.(2007) Order Trichoptera Kirby, 1813 (Insecta), Caddisflies. Zootaxa 1668, pp, 664. Magnolia Press 
 Li, Y.J. Morse, S.C. (1997) Species of the Genus Ecnomus (Trichoptera, Ecnomidae) from the People's Republic of China. Transactions, American Entomological Society, 123 85-134. 
 ;  2010: Phylogeny of the Ecnomidae (Insecta: Trichoptera). Cladistics, 26: 36-48.  (print) 1096-0031 (online) 
 Ward, J.B. Schefter, P.W. (2000) A new genus and twenty new species of New Caledonian Ecnomidae (Trichoptera) Records of the Canterbury Museum vol 14 pp 55–87.

External links 
Trichoptera world checklist

Trichoptera families